The Army Museum of Tasmania (formerly known as the Military Museum of Tasmania) is located within Anglesea Barracks in Hobart, Tasmania, Australia. Anglesea Barracks, constructed in 1814. The Barracks is included on the Commonwealth Heritage List.

The  museum is located in the military gaol which was built in 1847. The building has undergone few changes from when it was built despite its multiple uses, including as a girls reformatory, a married quarter, a store and offices.

Displays include items from the colonial period when the British Army occupied the barracks to the current operational deployments with a focus on Tasmanian servicemen and women within the Australian Defence Force.

See also

Royal Tasmania Regiment
Tasmanian Museum and Art Gallery
List of museums in Tasmania

References

Military and war museums in Australia
Museums in Hobart
Culture in Hobart